The enzyme protocatechuate decarboxylase catalyzes the chemical reaction

3,4-dihydroxybenzoate  catechol + CO2

This enzyme belongs to the family of lyases, specifically the carboxy-lyases, which cleave carbon-carbon bonds.  The systematic name of this enzyme class is 3,4-dihydroxybenzoate carboxy-lyase (catechol-forming). Other names in common use include 3,4-dihydroxybenzoate decarboxylase, and protocatechuate carboxy-lyase.  This enzyme participates in benzoate degradation via hydroxylation.

References

 

EC 4.1.1
Enzymes of unknown structure